Shamima is a feminine Arabic given name derived from  meaning "sweet smell". Notable bearers of the name include

Shamima Akhtar (1957 – 2018), Bangladeshi playback singer
Shamima Akhtar Tulee (born 1974), Bangladeshi Martial artist
Shamima Akter Liza (born 1989), Bangladesh chess Woman International Master
Shamima Ali, Fijian political activist
Shamima Begum (born 1999), British-born woman who left the UK aged 15 to join ISIL
Shamima Nazneen, Bangladeshi film, stage and television actress
Shamima Shaikh (1960 – 1998), South African Muslim women's rights activist, Islamic feminist and journalist
Shamima Sultana (born 1988), Bangladeshi cricketer

References

Arabic feminine given names